Ervie is a small village in Dumfries and Galloway,  Scotland, in the Rhins of Galloway, just outside Stranraer.

Villages in Dumfries and Galloway